Montan is a municipality with 1,701 inhabitants (as of 31 December 2018) in the South of South Tyrol in northern Italy, about  south of Bolzano. The name Montan comes from the Latin mons ("mountain").

Geography 
The municipality of Montan, totalling , extends on the orographically left, i.e. eastern flank of the South Tyrolean Lowlands (Unterland), as the section of the Adige valley between Bolzano and the Salorno chasm is called. The main settlement areas are located on a wide hillside terrace, on which sits the main town of Montan; somewhat south of it lie the two districts Pinzon and Glen. The Castelfeder hill between Neumarkt and Auer protrudes west of the main town into the Adige valley. Below the hill, the municipality of Montan also occupies a small part of the valley floor up to the Adige river.  

To the east of the main town, the terrain rises to the Cislon, a ridge of the forested mountain range that is part of the Fiemme Valley, which separates Unterland from Fiemme. This vast majority of this ridge is part of the protected Trudner Horn Nature Park and borders on the municipality of Truden. To the North, the Schwarzenbach valley forms the border to Aldein; here, a narrow strip of the municipality encloses parts of Kaltenbrunn. In the south, another strip of territory crosses the Truden stream valley and – bordering Neumarkt, Salorno, Truden and Capriana in Trentino – occupies the northwestern slopes of the Trudner Horn, where the small settlement of Gschnon is located.

Frazioni
The municipality of Montan contains the frazioni (subdivisions, mainly villages and hamlets) Glen (Gleno), Gschnon (Casignano), Kaltenbrunn (Fontanefredde), Kalditsch (Doladizza), and Pinzon (Pinzano).

Coat-of-arms
The emblem represents an argent lion, with fixed eyes and claws of or, on azure. It is the arms of the Lords of Enn who built the Castle in the twelfth century. The emblem was granted in 1967.

History
Finds from the pre-Christian area show that early settlements in the Montan area date back to that period. Results from linguistics research in the field of place and field names support this assumption. Local names of pre-Roman (Gomaroa, Tschalfai) and Romanesque (Kalditsch, Montan, Glen, Pinzon) origin suggest a lively settlement activity in the centuries BC and AD.
Around 955, Bavarian settlers began colonising the area. This colonisation culminated in the 12th century and ended in the mid-13th century. In 1133, the possession of the Weyarn monastery was registered at Enn court, as was the Sonnenburg monastery in Kalditsch in 1181. The lords of Enn appeared in Montan in the mid-12th century. 

In 1435, Pastor Hans Hach of Montan ("her Hans Hach pharrer zu Montæny") was a member of the South Tyrolean priesthood, which pledged to hold the Austrian anniversary in Holy Mary parish church in Bozen.
Until the end of the First World War, Montan belonged to the county of Tyrol and thus to the Austro-Hungarian empire. Within Tyrol, Montan was assigned to the Neumarkt judicial district, which in turn was part of the Bozen district. With the Treaty of Saint-Germain, Montan, along with most of Tyrol south of the main ridge of the Alps, was ceded to Italy in 1920.  When these former Austrian territories became the two provinces of Bozen and Trento in 1927, Montan and other surrounding villages were assigned to the predominantly Italian-speaking province of Trento. In 1948 that Montan became again part of the Province of Bolzano/South Tyrol.

Linguistic distribution
According to the 2011 census, 92.54% of the population speak German, 6.94% Italian and 0.52% Ladin as first language.

Education
There is a German-language primary school in Montan, which is part of the school district of the neighbouring municipality of Auer.

Main sights
 Castelfeder is a prehistoric and Roman settlement on a strategically important porphyry hill near Montan (South Tyrol) above Auer and represents a multi-sectioned, spacious dome.
 Enn castle
 Hans-Klocker altar, a winged altar by master Hans Klocker from Brixen in the St. Stefan church in Pinzon
 The cemetery holds the tomb of the Italian nationalist Ettore Tolomei.
 The former Fleimstal railway track is a destination for hikers in Montan. This railway line was built during the First World War. The route begins in Auer and originally led to Predazzo. A cycling and hiking trail now follows the well-preserved section between Auer and San Lugano.

Twin cities 
  Nuremberg, Germany

References

External links

 Official website
 Homepage of Montan

Municipalities of South Tyrol